Milton Willits Glenn (June 18, 1903 in Atlantic City, New Jersey – December 14, 1967 in Margate City, New Jersey) was an American Republican Party politician who represented New Jersey's 2nd congressional district in the United States House of Representatives from 1957–1965.

Biography
Glenn attended the schools of the Atlantic City School District and later Georgetown University in 1921 and 1922 and graduated from Dickinson School of Law in Carlisle, Pennsylvania in 1924. He was admitted to the bar in 1925 and commenced practice in Atlantic City, New Jersey. He was the municipal magistrate in Margate City, from January 1940 to November 1943. During World War II, Glenn was commissioned a lieutenant in the United States Navy and served from November 1943 to June 1946, and subsequently served as a Lieutenant Commander in the United States Naval Reserve.

After the war, he was elected to serve on the Atlantic County Board of Chosen Freeholders from June 1946 to January 1951. He was elected to the New Jersey General Assembly for an unexpired term in 1950, and was reelected in 1951, 1953, and 1955. He was elected as a Republican to the Eighty-fifth Congress to fill the vacancy caused by the death of T. Millet Hand; reelected to the Eighty-sixth, Eighty-seventh and Eighty-eighth Congresses, serving in the House from November 5, 1957, to January 3, 1965. Glenn voted in favor of the Civil Rights Acts of 1960 and 1964, as well as the 24th Amendment to the U.S. Constitution. Glenn was an unsuccessful candidate for reelection in 1964 to the Eighty-ninth Congress, falling to Democrat Thomas C. McGrath, Jr., who was making his first run for elective office.

After leaving Congress, he resumed the practice of law. Glenn died in Margate City on December 14, 1967, and was interred at West Creek Cemetery in West Creek, New Jersey.

References

External links

Milton Willits Glenn at The Political Graveyard

1903 births
1967 deaths
Dickinson School of Law alumni
Republican Party members of the New Jersey General Assembly
County commissioners in New Jersey
Georgetown University alumni
Republican Party members of the United States House of Representatives from New Jersey
People from Margate City, New Jersey
Politicians from Atlantic County, New Jersey
Military personnel from New Jersey
20th-century American politicians